Artemio Murakami (born 22 July 1983) is a Filipino professional golfer.

Murakami turned professional in 2005 and joined the Asian Tour in 2007. In his debut season he won his first tournament at the Iskandar Johor Open, and in 2008 he recorded his best Order of Merit finish of 47th. However since then his form has declined, and he lost his tour card at the end of 2010.

Murakami's father is Japanese; as a result he holds dual citizenship.

Amateur wins
1999 Philippine Amateur Championship

Professional wins (5)

Asian Tour wins (1)

ASEAN PGA Tour wins (1)

Philippine Golf Tour wins (1)

Other wins (2)
2007 Omega Invitational (Philippines)
2010 Philippine Open

Results in major championships

CUT = missed the half-way cut
Note: Murakami only played in the U.S. Open.

Team appearances
Amateur
Eisenhower Trophy (representing the Philippines): 2004

External links

Filipino male golfers
Asian Tour golfers
Filipino people of Japanese descent
Sportspeople from Manila
1983 births
Living people